Devon Michael Erickson (born September 21, 2000) is an American school shooter and murderer who, at the age of 18, murdered one student and injured 8 others on May 7, 2019, at STEM School Highlands Ranch in Douglas County, Colorado. Erickson is one of the two perpetrators of the shooting, alongside 16-year-old Alec McKinney.

Erickson was convicted of murder on 15 June 2021, at the age of 20. He received a sentence of life without parole.

Shooting 

On the afternoon of May 7, 2019, Devon Erickson and Alec McKinney briefly left Highlands Ranch STEM school during their lunch period and went to Erickson's house, where McKinney allegedly threatened Erickson into breaking open a gun safe with a crowbar and an ax. The safe contained three firearms, a rifle and three handguns, and were concealed by the duo in a guitar case and a backpack. The two also engaged in cocaine use before returning to Highlands Ranch.

Erickson claims that, upon returning to school, they parted ways once McKinney had entered through the school's back entrance, where he would have been less likely to be caught with the weapons. Although their stories differ, Erickson told police that he intended to inform a teacher of "McKinney's plans". However, he insists that his intent to do so dissipated when the two reunited.

The two targeted classroom 107 and entered together through separate doors. Erickson claims that, upon seeing Alec reach for one of the guns, he shouted for the classroom inhabitants to get down before being rushed at by two students. Erickson says that the impact of the students prompted his weapon to fire. Erickson insists that he did not intend for anyone to be harmed or shot at.

According to a student, Erickson allegedly pulled out a gun and yelled, "nobody f*cking move". Kendrick Ray Castillo jumped on him and was fatally shot in the chest. Erickson was then subdued and disarmed by two other students. This occurred in the high school section of STEM, while McKinney targeted the middle school section and wounded four students before being tackled by an armed security guard.

Officers did not have to fire at the suspects prior to them being taken into custody, later confirming that at least two handguns were used in the shooting, with three handguns and a rifle recovered. However, there was an instance of friendly fire during the response in which a private security guard reacted to a muzzle of a gun coming around the corner, that was later established to be held by a Douglas County Sheriff's deputy. Officers also went to Erickson's home and seized a car with hand-painted graffiti on it  reading "Fuck society", as well as "666" and a pentagram.

Victims 
One student was killed and eight others were injured in the shooting, two were in serious condition. On 12 May the last of wounded were released from the hospital. Officials told reporters that the youngest victim is 15 years old. There were no staff deaths or injuries; all victims were students.

At least three students, 18-year-old seniors Kendrick Castillo, Joshua Jones, and Brendan Bialy, lunged at an attacker, later identified as Erickson. The three students jumped from their desks and slammed the gunman against the wall.  The shooter fired off several shots as they struggled with him. Castillo was killed in the process, the only student killed during the shooting.  Jones was shot twice, receiving non-life-threatening injuries in his leg and hip. Bialy managed to wrestle the handgun away from the shooter during the struggle.

Legal proceedings 
After the initial court appearance on May 8, Erickson and McKinney were formally criminally charged for the shooting at a May 15 court hearing in the Douglas County court. Each of the two suspects was charged with 48 criminal counts, including "first-degree murder after deliberation, arson and burglary". McKinney was charged as an adult, although his lawyers tried to move his case to the juvenile court and the judge denied the motion.

On June 14, it was announced that the judge appointed to oversee both of the suspects' cases had recused herself from the case of McKinney but stayed on to oversee the case of Erickson.

On January 2, 2020, Erickson pleaded not guilty to first degree murder and other charges. His trial began on May 31, 2021. His defense team claimed that Erickson was an accomplice who was forced to commit the shooting. One of his defense attorneys said that he was a "confused kid" and "not a monster".

On June 15, 2021, Devon Erickson was convicted on 46 counts, including first-degree murder, attempted first-degree murder, conspiracy to commit first-degree murder and supplying a juvenile with a handgun. On September 17, 2021, Erickson was sentenced to life in prison without parole, plus 1,282 years.

See also 
 List of mass shootings in the United States in 2019
 List of school-related attacks
 List of school shootings in the United States
 List of shootings in Colorado

References 

Living people
American murderers
American male criminals
2000 births